Ching Ho is one of the 18 constituencies in the North District, Hong Kong.

The constituency returns one district councillor to the North District Council, with an election every four years.

Ching Ho constituency has an estimated population of 20,504.

Councillors represented

Election results

2010s

Notes

References

Fanling
Constituencies of Hong Kong
Constituencies of North District Council
2011 establishments in Hong Kong
Constituencies established in 2011